William Howard, 3rd Earl of Wicklow PC (I) (January 1761 – 27 September 1818), known as William Forward between 1780 and 1815, was an Anglo-Irish politician and peer.

Howard was the second son of Ralph Howard, 1st Viscount Wicklow and his wife, Alice Howard, 1st Countess of Wicklow. In 1780 he took the surname of Forward after succeeding to the estates of his mother's family. Between 1783 and 1800 he served in the Irish House of Commons as the Member of Parliament for St Johnstown. In 1793 was made a member of the Privy Council of Ireland. From 1800 to 1808 he was Treasurer of the Irish Post Office and from 1814 Governor of Wicklow.  He reverted his surname to Howard after succeeding his brother, Robert Howard, 2nd Earl of Wicklow, as Earl in 1815.

On 31 March 1787, he married Eleanor Caulfeild, the only daughter of Hon. Francis Caulfeild MP. He was succeeded by his eldest son, William Howard.

References

Bibliography
 Murdoch, Tessa, ed., Great Irish Households: Inventories from the Long Eighteenth Century. Cambridge: John Adamson, 2022  . See pp. 229–34 for a transcript of the inventory of furniture drawn up for the 3rd earl, recording the Georgian house at Shelton Abbey just before its remodelling by the 4th earl as a Gothic house with crenellated parapets.

1761 births
1818 deaths
William
Irish MPs 1783–1790
Irish MPs 1790–1797
Irish MPs 1798–1800
Members of the Privy Council of Ireland
Members of the Parliament of Ireland (pre-1801) for County Donegal constituencies
3